Hustvedt is a surname. Notable people with the surname include:

Dick Hustvedt (1946–2008), American software engineer
Lloyd Hustvedt (1922–2004), American professor and scholar of Norwegian-American history
Olaf M. Hustvedt (1886–1978), American admiral
Siri Hustvedt (born 1955), American novelist and essayist